Dahaneh-ye Porsu Qui (also Romanized as Dahaneh-ye Porsū Qū’ī; also known as Dahaneh, Dahneh, and Desni) is a village in Aq Su Rural District, in the Central District of Kalaleh County, Golestan Province, Iran. At the 2006 census, its population was 2,315, in 486 families.

References 

Populated places in Kalaleh County